Volunteers is a 1985 American comedy film directed by Nicholas Meyer and starring Tom Hanks and John Candy.

Plot
Lawrence Bourne III (Tom Hanks), is a spoiled rich kid who just graduated from Yale  Class of 1962 with a $28,000 gambling debt. After his father, Lawrence Bourne Jr. (George Plimpton), refuses to pay his debt, he escapes his angry creditors by trading places with his college roommate Kent (Xander Berkeley), jumping on a Peace Corps flight to Thailand. On the plane, he meets Washington State graduate Tom Tuttle from Tacoma (John Candy) and the beautiful, down-to-earth Beth Wexler (Rita Wilson), the latter rejecting his advances once realizing why he is really there.

In Thailand, they are assigned by John Reynolds (Tim Thomerson) to build a bridge for the local villagers. On day one, Tuttle gets into an argument with the villagers over what wood to use; the only one who speaks English is At Toon (Gedde Watanabe).

Tuttle then gets captured by communist forces who brainwash him into doing their bidding, while Reynolds makes passes at Beth. Lawrence befriends At Toon, teaching him and several other villagers various gambling card games, but they are met by the powerful drug lord Chung Mee (Ernest Harada), who forces them to finish the bridge quickly.

Lawrence eventually wins Beth over but she is captured by Reynolds, who is working with Chung Mee. They rescue Beth, who urges them to destroy the bridge; Lawrence reluctantly agrees after professing his love for her. They get the villagers on board with the plan and get Tuttle back to reality, plotting to leave dynamite in the center of the bridge so that the entire structure collapses. Their plan works fine until Lawrence is confronted by Reynolds, who threatens to kill him. Lawrence distracts Reynolds long enough to enact the plan, jumping into the river as the bridge explodes. Beth saves Lawrence by performing CPR, and they kiss once Lawrence wakes.

Some time later, Lawrence and Beth are married in the Thai village. Lawrence writes to his parents saying he finally did something right for the right reasons.

Cast
Tom Hanks as Lawrence Bourne III
John Candy as Tom Tuttle
Rita Wilson as Beth Wexler
Tim Thomerson as John Reynolds
Gedde Watanabe as At Toon
George Plimpton as Lawrence Bourne, Jr.
Ernest Harada as Chung Mee
Allan Arbus as Albert Bardenaro
Xander Berkeley as Kent Sutcliffe

Production
The film was in the works for six years before it was made. Volunteers was filmed in Tuxtepec, Oaxaca, Mexico. A cast of over 100 people from all over the world, including Thai families, spent two and a half months filming.

Meyer states that the director of the Peace Corps, Sargent Shriver, read the script and complained that it "was like spitting on the American flag," and demanded changes. The changes were never made, but by the time the film was released, Shriver was no longer director, and Peace Corps officials were willing to endorse the film.

This film marked the reunion of Hanks and Candy, who starred in Splash. It is also the film where Hanks reconnected with his future wife, Rita Wilson, whom he had first met when they worked on an episode of Bosom Buddies.

The scene in which Wilson and Hanks enjoy Coca-Cola was criticized as product placement, as TriStar was a unit of Columbia Pictures, then owned by The Coca-Cola Company. Co-writer Levine denies this, stating that the scene appeared in the first draft of the film written in 1980, when Metro-Goldwyn-Mayer was to be the studio.

The film spoofs a number of David Lean epics, including Lawrence of Arabia and The Bridge on the River Kwai, with the Washington State University Fight Song used in place of the "Colonel Bogey March".

Reception

Box office
The film debuted No. 2 at the box office, earning $5,184,360 over its opening weekend.  It ultimately grossed a domestic total of $19,875,740.

Critical response
Volunteers received generally mixed reviews from critics. The film holds a 58% positive "Rotten" score on the review aggregator Rotten Tomatoes.

Walter Goodman of The New York Times praised the "steady directorial hand" of Nicholas Meyer and the "stylishly droll performance" of Tom Hanks, about whom Goodman added, "He is a center of confidence amid the frantic goings-on, turning peril into opportunity with an accent and aplomb that are the birthright of an eighth-generation Bourne."

Conversely, Variety called it "a very broad and mostly flat comedy" and wrote, "Toplined Tom Hanks gets in a few good zingers as an upperclass snob doing time in Thailand, but promising premise and opening shortly descend into unduly protracted tedium."

See also
 List of American films of 1985

References

External links
Volunteers at IMDb

1985 films
1985 comedy films
Films scored by James Horner
Films about the Central Intelligence Agency
Films about the Peace Corps
Films directed by Nicholas Meyer
Films set in 1962
Films set in Thailand
Films shot in Mexico
TriStar Pictures films
HBO Films films
Films produced by Walter F. Parkes
1980s English-language films